Harestua is a town in Lunner kommune, Viken county, Norway. It has 2318 inhabitants. Harestua is located 46 kilometeres north of Oslo, and functions as a commuter town to the capital. It is served by Harestua Station on the Gjøvik Line. 

Harestua maintains 6 neighbourhoods; Gamlefeltet, Nyfeltet, Vestbygda, Bjørgeseter, Haneknemoen, Haganskogen and Stryken. Harestua has a small town centre with services such as a petrol station, grocery stores and fast food outlets. 

Harestua also has a combined elementary- and junior high school. The school has approximately 400 pupils.

The Harestua Solar Observatory is located nearby. 

During the 1940 German invasion of Norway, Harestua was the location of several skirmishes between German and Norwegian forces.

References

Villages in Oppland
Villages in Viken (county)